Wisła Płock Spółka Akcyjna (Wisła Płock S.A.), commonly referred to as Wisła Płock, is a Polish professional football club, based in Płock, Masovian Voivodeship, which plays in the Ekstraklasa, the top tier of the national football league system.

Previous names 
1947: Elektryczność Płock
1950: ZS Ogniwo Płock (Elektryczność + ZS Ogniwo)
spring 1955: ZS Sparta Płock (ZS Ogniwo + ZS Sparta)
autumn 1955: PKS [Płocki KS] Wisła Płock
1963: ZKS Wisła Płock
1 January 1992: ZKS Petrochemia Płock
1 July 1999: KS Petro Płock
27 June 2000: Orlen Płock
7 June 2002: ZKS Wisła Płock

Achievements

Domestic 
 Ekstraklasa:
4th place : 2005
5th place : 2004, 2018
 Polish Cup:
Winner (1): 2006
Finalist (1): 2003
 Polish SuperCup:
Winner (1): 2006

Europe 
 UEFA Cup:
Qualifying round (1): 2003/2004
Second qualifying round (2): 2005/2006, 2006/2007

European record

Stadion im. Kazimierza Górskiego 

 Address: 34 Ignacy Łukasiewicz Street, 09–400 Płock
 Patron: Kazimierz Górski
 Opened: 10 June 1973
 Capacity: 12,800
 Surface: 105 x 68 metres

Current squad

Out on loan

Coaching staff
{| class="wikitable"
!Position
!Staff
|-
|Coach|| Pavol Staňo
|-
|Assistant coach|| Norbert Guľa
|-
|Assistant coach|| Łukasz Nadolski
|-
|Assistant coach|| Dariusz Pietrasiak
|-
|Goalkeeping coach|| Maciej Sikorski
|-
|Assistant goalkeeping coach|| Daniel Iwanowski
|-
|Fitness coach|| Mateusz Oszust
|-
|Match analyst|| Norbert Onuoha
|-
|Physiotherapist|| Bartosz Gralewski
|-
|Physiotherapist|| Katarzyna Grzybowska
|-
|Masseur|| Krzysztof Mysera
|-
|Team manager|| Piotr Soczewka
|-
|Technical manager|| Magdalena Pawlak
|-

Notable players 
Player who have been capped and/or players which have won honours with the club

See also 
 Football in Poland
 List of football teams
 Champions' Cup/League
 UEFA Cup

References

External links 

  Official website
 (in Polish) Fan Site
  Wisłą Płock at 90minut.pl

 
Sport in Płock
Football clubs in Masovian Voivodeship
Association football clubs established in 1947
1947 establishments in Poland